Dorycera brevis is a species of picture-winged fly in the genus Dorycera of the family Ulidiidae found in Greece.

References

brevis
Insects described in 1868
Diptera of Europe